Noves is a commune in the Bouches-du-Rhône department in southern France.

Population

Sights
 Church of Sainte Baudille, located in the site of a 3rd-century Palaeo-Christian worship area and of a Roman temple. The current building was built by will of the bishops of Avignon in the 10th century
 Chapel of the White Penitents, built in the 12th century over a former synagogue. 
 Church of Notre-Dame de Piété, founded as a Franciscan hermitage in the 13th century. The current edifice dates to the 1630 and 1720s reconstructions.

Twin towns
  Calcinaia, Italy

See also
 Communes of the Bouches-du-Rhône department

References

Communes of Bouches-du-Rhône
Cavares
Bouches-du-Rhône communes articles needing translation from French Wikipedia